Bukowie may refer to the following places:
Bukowie, Opole Voivodeship (south-west Poland)
Bukowie, Świętokrzyskie Voivodeship (south-central Poland)
Bukowie, West Pomeranian Voivodeship (north-west Poland)